Georgia Mackenzie (born 19 May 1973) is a British actress.

Career 
Mackenzie's notable screen credits include Sarah Beckenham in the BBC's BAFTA nominated series Outlaws, Jackie Haggar in ITV's Hot Money (since remade in Hollywood as Mad Money), and Sally opposite Kris Marshall in the rom-com Catwalk Dogs. She also played the role of Nurse Judy in the 2002 comedy series TLC.

On the big screen she has been seen as Teri in Franklyn (2008), as Paola Fonseca in Possession (2002), as Jane Graham opposite Timothy Hutton in The Kovak Box (2007) and more recently as TV chef Kathy King in Steel Trap (2009). Most recently, Georgia completed a well-received turn as LEA chief Jennifer Headley in BBC One's hit television drama, Waterloo Road.

She appeared in Midsomer Murders “Murder of Innocence” as Susie Bellingham (2012) and also in Vexed as Joanna Poynter. She also appeared in Casualty “Secrets and Lies”, “Mistakes Happen” (2013), “Bad Timing” (2014) as Carol Walcott. In 2020 she acted in Silent Witness “Hope: Part 1” as Ruth Cooper and also in Unforgotten as Dr. Leanne Balcombe (2018, 2021).

In 2019, Mackenzie narrated the documentary series Cop Car Workshop for the TV channel Dave. In 2020, she wrote an episode of Passions.

Personal life
Mackenzie's father, Colin Mackenzie, was a journalist known for tracking down Ronnie Biggs in Rio de Janeiro. Her grandmother, Hazel Adair, was a screenwriter and producer who created created the TV series Compact and Crossroads.

Mackenzie met her husband, actor Richard Coyle, when they were filming Up Rising together in 1999. They married in 2004 and divorced in 2010.

Filmography

Film

Television

Video games

References

External links
 
 Harvey voices - Georgia Mackenzie

1973 births
Living people
People from Abergavenny
English film actresses
English television actresses
Welsh film actresses
English people of Welsh descent